The Essentials is a compilation album by American heavy metal band Twisted Sister, released in 2002.

Track listing 
 "We're Not Gonna Take It" - 3:44
 "I Wanna Rock" - 3:06
 "Leader of the Pack" - 3:44
 "You Can't Stop Rock 'n' Roll" - 4:40
 "Stay Hungry" - 3:03
 "Under the Blade" - 4:39
 "Come Out and Play" - 4:55
 "Love Is for Suckers" - 3:25
 "I Believe in Rock 'n' Roll" - 4:03
 "The Kids Are Back" - 3:16
 "I'll Never Grow Up, Now!" - 4:09
 "Shoot 'Em Down" - 3:52

Credits

Twisted Sister
Dee Snider - lead vocals
Eddie "Fingers" Ojeda - lead & rhythm guitars
Jay Jay French - rhythm & lead guitars
Mark "The Animal" Mendoza - bass
A. J. Pero - drums
Joey "Seven" Franco - drums on "Love Is for Suckers"

References

Twisted Sister albums
2002 compilation albums